Little Crater Lake is a spring-fed lake in the Mount Hood National Forest in Clackamas County, Oregon, United States. It is named after Crater Lake, also in Oregon.

Geology
Little Crater Lake is considered an oddity, with earlier geologists theorizing it formed from a collapsed lava tube because of its steep and overhanging walls. Later geologists believe it originated from a volcanic maar or was created from block faulting. Artesian water from an underground spring fills the resulting depression with water. The lake was named after Crater Lake, also in Oregon, due to their shared blue waters. The water in Little Crater Lake is a constant  33.3 °F (0.7222222°C).

See also
Crater Lake

References

External links

Little Crater Lake at Recreation.gov

Mount Hood
Lakes of Clackamas County, Oregon
Mount Hood National Forest
Protected areas of Clackamas County, Oregon
Springs of Oregon
Lakes of Oregon